Dean Barrick (born 30 September 1969) is an English former footballer.

He played primarily as a left back for Preston North End, Rotherham United and Cambridge United amongst other clubs in a career spanning 17 years.

As a manager, he took Hucknall Town to the 2005 FA Trophy final.
He was the head of physical education at The British School in Warsaw, Poland.

Dean Barrick was also a physical education teacher at Hatfield Visual Arts College in Hatfield, Doncaster.

References

1969 births
Living people
English footballers
Sheffield Wednesday F.C. players
Rotherham United F.C. players
Cambridge United F.C. players
Preston North End F.C. players
Bury F.C. players
Ayr United F.C. players
Doncaster Rovers F.C. players
Hereford United F.C. players
Nuneaton Borough F.C. players
Hucknall Town F.C. players
Hucknall Town F.C. managers
People from Hemsworth
Association football defenders
English football managers